Jason Small (born June 7, 1979) is an American former stock car racing driver.

Nextel Cup Series

Small made one career Nextel Cup Series start and it came in 2002 at Michigan, for Price Motorsports. He started 41st and ended up finishing there, after his brakes failed early.

Craftsman Truck Series

Small made his CTS debut in 2000, running at Mesa Marin. That race he started 20th in the truck owned by Walker Evans, but struggled to a 28th-place finish. He then switched to Green Light Racing, where he competed one race for the team at O'Reilly Raceway Park with a 25th-place result.

Small started three races then for Sonntag Racing in 2001. His best run for the team came in his debut with them, where he started 19th and finished 25th at Homestead-Miami. Small then moved onto a family owned team for two late races in the year. He earned his then best career run at Phoenix, when he came home 19th.

Small reunited with Green Light Racing in 2002 and his runs with the team earned him 21st in the points as he competed in all the races. Immediately, Small started out with a 9th place in the season opener at Daytona. Small, though, would only earn one more top-ten on the year: a 10th at Las Vegas. Small's meager 22nd in points could largely be blamed to inconsistency. Small did not finish seven races. At one point, he did not even finish six consecutive races. Such inconsistency led to Small's release at the end of the season.

Small did not go away, however, and once again he restarted his family team for three 2003 races. After a 21st place season debut, Small earned his third career top-10: a 10th at California. A 23rd-place finish at Phoenix would be his last start of the year.

Small was called upon in mid-2004 to drive the No. 13 ThorSport Racing Chevy in place of Tina Gordon. Small did his fill-in role decently, earning a best finish of 21st at Darlington. However, the ride did not convert into any more races and Small has not raced in NASCAR since.

Motorsports career results

NASCAR
(key) (Bold – Pole position awarded by qualifying time. Italics – Pole position earned by points standings or practice time. * – Most laps led.)

Winston Cup Series

Craftsman Truck Series

References

External links
 

NASCAR drivers
Racing drivers from Bakersfield, California
Living people
1979 births